Şandor Gal (born November 23, 1955) is a former Romanian ice hockey player. He played for the Romania men's national ice hockey team at the 1976 Winter Olympics in Innsbruck, and the 1980 Winter Olympics in Lake Placid.

References

1955 births
Living people
People from Miercurea Ciuc
Ice hockey players at the 1976 Winter Olympics
Ice hockey players at the 1980 Winter Olympics
Olympic ice hockey players of Romania
Romanian sportspeople of Hungarian descent